Adel Bougueroua (born 14 June 1987) is an Algerian footballer who is currently playing as forward for WA Boufarik.

References

External links

1987 births
Living people
Association football forwards
Algerian footballers
CR Belouizdad players
RC Arbaâ players
21st-century Algerian people